Friedrich Voss (or Voß) may refer to:

 Friedrich Voss (civil engineer) (1872–1953), German civil engineer
 Friedrich Voss (composer) (born 1930), German composer and pianist
 Friedrich Voss (politician)